Shenzhen Open may refer to:

ATP Shenzhen Open, a men's professional tennis tournament
WTA Shenzhen Open, a women's professional tennis tournament
Shenzhen Longhua Open, a professional tennis tournament